LII Army Corps (LII. Armeekorps) was a corps in the German Army during World War II. The LII. Armeekorps was destroyed during the Jassy–Kishinev Offensive (August 1944).

Commanders

 Infantry General (General der Infanterie) Kurt von Briesen, 25 November 1940 – 20 November 1941 
 Lieutenant-General (Generalleutnant) Albert Zehler, 20 November 1941 – 10 December 1941
 Infantry General (General der Infanterie) Eugen Ott, 10 December 1941 – 1 October 1943
 Infantry General (General der Infanterie) Hans-Karl von Scheele, 1 October 1943 – 20 November 1943
 Infantry General (General der Infanterie) Erich Buschenhagen, 20 November 1943 – 1 February 1944
 Infantry General (General der Infanterie) Rudolf von Bünau, 1 February 1944 – 1 April 1944 
 Infantry General (General der Infanterie) Erich Buschenhagen, 1 April 1944 – August 1944

Area of operations
Germany - November 1940 – June 1941
Eastern Front, southern sector - June 1941 – August 1944

See also
 List of German corps in World War II

External links

Army,52
Military units and formations established in 1940
Military units and formations disestablished in 1944